The President's Bodyguard (PBG) is an elite household cavalry regiment of the Indian Army. It is the senior-most regiment in the order of precedence of the units of the Indian Army. The primary role of the President's Bodyguard is to escort and protect the President of India which is why the regiment is based in the Rashtrapati Bhavan in New Delhi, India. It is equipped as a mounted unit, with horses for ceremonies at the presidential palace and BTR-80 vehicles for use in combat. The personnel of the regiment are also trained as paratroopers and nominally are expected to lead in airborne assaults in the role of pathfinders. The regiment is the successor of the Governor General's Bodyguard of the British Raj.

History

The first bodyguard to be raised in India was in 1773 when European troops, already recruited into the East India Company's service as infantry, were earmarked for the role. Since the army of the East India Company had no cavalry of any kind at that point of time, two troops of dragoons and one troop of hussars were raised - the latter becoming the personal bodyguard of the Governor-General. These were however disbanded in the reorganisation of the army by Robert Clive after his return to India in 1765. By 1772, the Company did not have a single cavalryman in service.

President's Bodyguard (PBG) is the oldest surviving mounted unit and the senior most regiment of the Indian Army. It was raised by Governor-General Warren Hastings in September 1773. Hastings handpicked 50 troopers from the Moghal Horse, a unit which was raised in 1760 by local sirdars. In the same year, the Raja, Cheyt Singh of Benares (now Varanasi) provided another 50 troopers, that took the strength of the unit to 100. The first commander of the unit was Captain Sweeny Toone, an officer of the East India Company, who had Lieutenant Samuel Black as his subaltern.

The establishment of the unit was as follows:
 1 Captain
 1 Lieutenant
 4 Sergeants
 6 Daffadars
 100 troopers
 2 Trumpeters
 1 Farrier

The Bodyguard was the only corps of cavalry in the Bengal Presidency until 1777 when two regiments of cavalry were transferred to the Company by the Nawab of Oudh. Both the regiments were raised in 1776.

Name
The name of the regiment has changed throughout its history:

Strength and ethnic composition
The strength of this regiment has varied throughout its history. The minimum strength of the unit was 50 when it was raised in 1773, but the precise maximum strength of the unit is not known. The President of India's website claims a number of 1,929, just before the First Sikh War but some historians believe the number to have been 469. According to the book "Historical Records of the Governor General's Body Guards", published in 1910, the maximum strength of the unit was 529 all ranks on 12 February 1844, just before the first Sikh War. In addition to 529 soldiers of all ranks, orders were also issued to attach two Rissalahs of Irregular Cavalry, taking the strength of the unit to 730 all ranks. The present strength of the regiment is 4 officers, 20 junior commissioned officers and 198 sowars (cavalrymen).

The ethnic composition of the unit varied equally. Recruitment started when the unit was raised in 1773 by Governor Warren Hastings, with a strength of 50 handpicked troopers. This nucleus of the Bodyguard was later augmented by another 50 horsemen, provided by Maharaja Chait Singh of Benares, thus bringing the overall strength of the regiment up to 100 horses and men by the end of that year.

By 1800, Hindus (Brahmins and Rajputs) were allowed to join the GGBG along with Muslims, but the area of the recruitment remained the same: Awadh & Bihar. In 1800, the recruitment pool was changed from the Bengal Presidency to the Madras Presidency and the GGBG was reconstituted with troopers from the Madras cavalry for the next 60 years. During this period, South Indian castes comprised the bulk of this unit. After the Great Mutiny of 1857, the center of recruitment of the Indian Army was shifted from Awadh and southern India to northern India. The GGBG was no exception and Sikhs were allowed to enlist for the first time in Aug 1883 and Punjabi Muslims in October 1887. The recruitment of Brahmins ceased in 1895. After that, the proportions of recruits was fixed at 50% Sikhs (Malwa and Majha) and 50% Muslims (Hindustani & Punjabi).

Currently Jats, Rajputs and Jat Sikhs  taken in equal numbers 33.1 percent, primarily from the states of Punjab, Haryana and Rajasthan.

Battle honours
The President's Bodyguard has the following battle honours:
 Java
 Ava
 Maharajpoor
 Moodkee
 Ferozeshah
 Aliwal
 Sobraon

all of which, except for "Java", are considered to be repugnant (i.e. earned during the British rule of India) and cannot be carried on regimental colours.

Operational history
The PBG first saw action in 1773–74, when it was deployed against Sanyasis – a band that ravaged the countryside in the guise of mendicants. Its next campaign was against Rohillas in April 1774 in the battle of St. George where the Rohillas were defeated completely. The Bodyguard was also present during the 3rd Mysore War (1790–92) against Tipu Sultan. During this campaign, it successfully thwarted an assassination attempt on the life of Governor General Lord Cornwallis. In 1801, a detachment consisting of one Native Officer and 26 other ranks went to Egypt to provide riders for an experimental unit of horse artillery. It marched for 120 miles in the desert in the height of summer. All their horses died and they had to place the guns on camels. The Bodyguard detachment never saw action in Egypt, as Alexandria had capitulated by the time that they arrived there.

These campaigns did not bring any Battle Honours to the GGBG. They earned their first Battle Honour 'Java' in 1811, during the conquest of the island. At present the PBG has the unique distinction of being the only surviving unit to carry this honour. In 1824, a detachment volunteered to sail over the kaala paani ("black water", or open ocean, which Hindu soldiers once refrained from crossing, for fear of losing their caste) to take part in the First Anglo-Burmese War and earned their second Battle Honour "Ava". The Bodyguard received their third Battle Honour 'Maharajpore' for the battle of Maharajpore in 1843, when the British intervened in the battle for the succession that erupted in Gwalior after the death of Maharaja Scindia.

The PBG fought in all the main battles of the First Sikh War and earned four Battle Honours. During the 1857 Great Mutiny, Lord Canning asked the Indian officers and other ranks to serve without arms as a precautionary measure, which they did in good faith. With their loyalty established, the Bodyguard later escorted Lord Canning to the grand Durbar at Allahabad where on 1 November 1858, it was proclaimed that India would be governed by the British Crown, and the title of Viceroy was conferred on the Governor General.

During World War I, Lord Hardinge offered the Bodyguards as Divisional Cavalry for the Meerut Division, which was going to France, but it was decided that the best use of the Bodyguards would to act as trainers for raw remounts of cavalry and artillery. Thus for the entire period of the WW1, GGBG worked as remount training center. However, a detachment of the unit was sent to France as a reinforcement for the 3rd Skinner's Horse. During World War II, for a brief period of time, the GGBG served as 44th Division Reconnaissance Squadron.

Independence came with the partition of the nation and armed forces were also divided in 2:1 ratio between India and Pakistan. GGBG was no exception, the Muslim elements of the unit went to Pakistan, and Sikhs, Jats and Rajput elements stayed with India. The title of the regiment remained GGBG till 26 January 1950, when India became a republic and the GGBG became the President's Body Guard. The title remained GGBG in Pakistan, until it became a republic in 1956. The first commandant of the regiment was Lieutenant Colonel Thakur Govind Singh and his adjutant was Sahabzada Yaqub Khan, who decided to join Pakistan Army. After the division of other assets of the regiment, when it came to the gold plated buggy of the Viceroy, both India & Pakistan wanted it. To decide the fate of the buggy, Colonel Singh and Sahabzada Yaqub Khan tossed a coin and India got the buggy.

The PBG has seen action in all of independent India's major wars. It rendered yeoman service in the capitol and helped reinstate confidence in the general public in the aftermath of the Partition. After Independence, Humbers and Daimler armoured cars formed the mounts of the PBG and were deployed in the defense of Chushul at heights above 14,000 ft during the 1962 Indo-China War.

It participated in Operation Ablaze in the 1965 Indo-Pak war. The regiment served in Siachen glacier, where it has been serving till date. A detachment of the regiment was a part of the Indian Peace Keeping Force (IPKF) to Sri Lanka during 1988–89, and Indian contingents to the UN Peace Keeping Forces in Somalia, Angola and Sierra Leone.

Other bodyguard units
Before Independence, there were three more body guard units, one for each Presidency. These units were called Governor's Body Guard (and not Governor General's Body Guards). All these units were disbanded in 1947.

Governor's Body Guard, Madras

This was the senior most regiment among the three Governor's Body Guard regiments. Raised in 1778 at Madras with one Sergeant, one Corporal and 12 European troopers, it was placed under command of Lieutenant. P. Sullivan. Unlike other Madras Army regiments, GBG, Madras retained its title throughout its history till 1947, when it was disbanded. The strength and composition of the unit, however, kept on changing. In 1778, it had one European troop and in 1781, the strength was raised to 1 European and 1 Native troop. The European troop was disbanded in 1784 and a company of the light infantry was attached. By 1799, strength of the GBG was raised to 100 men and they performed escort duty in Persia and Mysore war. From 1808 to 1820, detachments from different Madras cavalry regiments joined GBG on rotation.

The regiment took part in third Maratha War (1817–1819), where its charge along with 6th Bengal Light Cavalry changed the course of the war and it was considered as the decisive factor in winning the war. During the war, the regiment earned its only Battle Honour 'Seetabuldee' for the relief of Nagpur Residency. GBG, Madras also took part in the First Burma War (1824–1826), where it rescued the advance guard which was surrounded by a large body of enemy force at Pagan. During the First World War, the regiment served as a remount training center and also patrolled the beaches during the bombardment of Madras by a German ship Emden. A combined force was also formed from detachment from Bombay and Madras Body Guards and was sent to serve in France.

The Governor's Body Guards, Madras also received a standard from Lord Willingdon in March 1924 bearing its Battle Honour 'Seetabuldee'. At the time of its raising, the unit only had European troops. But 1781 onwards, South Indian classes dominated the regiment for most of the time, especially Deccani and Madrasi Muslims. In 1947, the unit had Rajputs from Rajasthan and Jats from Western United Provinces and Punjab.

Governor's Body Guard, Bombay

The unit was raised on 22 March 1865 in Poona from a selected body of troopers of a disbanded unit, The Southern Mahratta Horse (SMH), which was first raised in 1850. Though the unit was re-organized twice in 1895 and 1938, there was no change in its title. It also retained its title throughout its existence until 1947, when it was disbanded. In 1865, it had Mahratta troopers only from SMH; but later Sikhs, Deccani Muslims and Punjabi Muslims also served in the unit.

Governor's Body Guard, Bengal

In 1912, the capital of India was transferred from Calcutta to Delhi and the Viceroy, along with Governor General's Body Guard, moved to Delhi and Bengal got the status of the Presidency just like Bombay and Madras. At that time, Captain Rivers Berney Worgan of 20th Deccan Horse raised Governor's BG, Bengal from volunteers from different Bengal cavalry regiments. This was the youngest unit among three GBG units. GBG, Bengal also retained its title throughout its existence and was also disbanded in 1947. Only Punjabi Muslims, Jats and Rajputs were recruited for the unit.

With respect to uniforms, all three GBG units followed the basic scarlet pattern with blue facings of the Governor General's Body Guards. There were however a number of distinctions such as cummerbunds and plastrons between the three Bodyguards.

Standards, guidons & banners

In 1779, the East India Company started issuing standards to Indian cavalry regiments. In 1800, GGBG was presented with its first Standard by Marquess Wellesley at the conclusion of his Review of the Body Guard. In 1815, the Countess of Moira and Loudon presented a standard to the newly raised squadron. Two more Standards were presented to the newly raised squadrons of the Body Guards in 1844, when the strength of the regiment was highest. Standards were abolished in regiments of Indian Cavalry in 1864 and in 1931, a Guidon was presented to the Body Guards, which was last carried on escorts in 1936.

Two Silver state trumpets with banners were presented to the Bodyguard by the Lord Reading in 1923, on the 150th anniversary of the raising of the unit. One banner represented the Star of India with the battle honours of the regiment, and the other banner carried the coat-of-arms of the viceroy. Each successive viceroy presented a banner to the Bodyguard upon assuming office; the banners of previous viceroys being kept in the custody of the regiment. The practice continues in effect until the present day with each President of the Republic of India in turn presenting a silver trumpet to the regiment - although the coat-of-arms of the Viceroy is replaced by the monogram of the President.

The first trumpet with banner of the President of the Republic of India was presented by Rajendra Prasad on 14 May 1957. It had a maroon background with the emblem and crest in gold thread. The design incorporated the initials of Rajendra Prasad in Devanagri script in the centre and four emblems in gold in all four corners of the banner, from the Personal Standard of the President. Prasad's personal standard was presented to the regiment on 18 January 1958 by the President himself. In November 1958, President Prasad presented a new Regimental Standard to the PBG, the previous Regimental Standard having been laid up after India became a republic. The old regimental standard rests in the Regiment's Officer's mess.

When the second President of India, Sarvepalli Radhakrishnan assumed office, he presented his banner to the PBG on 21 October 1962. His banner had a grey background with emblem and crest in gold thread. The design incorporated his initials in Devanagari script in the center and four emblems in gold in the four corners, from the Personal flag of the President. The new President's Standard of the Body Guard and the Regimental Standard were awarded by President Radhakrishnan on 11 November 1963. The Regimental Standard is dark blue in colour with the regimental crest in the centre surrounded by lotus flowers and Ashoka leaves. Five scrolls on either side of the crest record the regiment's Battle Honours and the standard bears the motto "Bharat Mata ki Jai".

Present status
In 2003, the President's Bodyguard had an establishment of 7 officers, 15 NCOs, and 140 enlisted men, for a total strength of 180 men. Throughout its history, the Bodyguard has varied in size from 50 men when first raised, to 1929 men in 1845. However, it was usually around squadron size, or about 130 men.

By tradition, the Commanding Officer has always been of Brigadier or Colonel rank. Recruitment to the Regiment in India is now 1/3 each from Sikh Jats, Hindu Jats, and Rajputs, with officers and administrative staff from all over India.

See also 
 Tri-Services Guard of Honour (India)
 Samman Guard
 President Guard Regiment (Bangladesh)
 President's Bodyguard (Pakistan)
 Household Cavalry (United Kingdom)

References

External links

 The President's Bodyguard
 The PBG Man Wins Medal

 The President's Bodyguard documentary

Protective security units
Armoured and cavalry regiments of the Indian Army from 1947
Guards regiments
Indian ceremonial units